Jolly Fisherman Seaplane Base  is a public use seaplane base located on Elbow Lake in Becker County, Minnesota, United States. It is 17 nautical miles (31 km) east of the central business district of Waubun, a city in Mahnomen County. The airport is privately owned and managed by Anne Buelow, owner of the Jolly Fisherman Resort.

Facilities and aircraft 
It has one seaplane landing area designated 8/26 which measures 5,000 by 1,800 feet (1,524 x 549 m). For the 12-month period ending September 30, 2003, the airport had 80 general aviation aircraft operations, an average of 6 per month.

References

External links 
 Aerial photo as of 20 April 1991 from USGS The National Map
 

Airports in Minnesota
Buildings and structures in Becker County, Minnesota
Transportation in Becker County, Minnesota
Seaplane bases in the United States